Phalaenopsis viridis is a species of orchid native to the Indonesian island Sumatra.

Description 
This epiphytic species has 30 cm long and 8 cm wide, ovate to elliptic ovate leaves.  The simultaneously opening flowers have brown colouration overlaying the green ground colour. The area of the column and labellum is devoid of such colouration. The inflorescence is erect and strongly lignified.

Ecology 
This species grows in limestone and in open fields, where it is faced with low nutrient availability and drought, which in turn favours lignification of sclerenchyma. It is found at altitudes of 1000 m above sea level.

Etymology 
The specific epithet viridis means green and refers to the floral colouration.

References 

viridis
Plants described in 1907
Orchids of Sumatra
Orchids of Indonesia
Endemic flora of Indonesia
Endemic flora of Sumatra